Notagonum feredayi is a species of ground beetle in the subfamily Platyninae. It was described by Bates in 1874.

References

External links
 

Notagonum
Beetles described in 1874